Events from the year 1718 in Sweden

Incumbents
 Monarch – Charles XII then Ulrika Eleonora

Events

 April – The royal privateer Lars Gathenhielm dies and his widow Ingela Gathenhielm takes over his Baltic privateer- and pirate empire.
 May – Charles XII issue peace negotiations with Russia on Åland, handled by Georg Heinrich von Görtz, in a hope to conquer the Danish province of Norway with Russian help. 
 29 August – 10,000 men under the command of Lieutenant-general Carl Gustaf Armfeldt attacked Trøndelag from Jemtland.
 October 30 – Charles XII attacks Norway. 
 November 12 – Georg Heinrich von Görtz leaves the negotiations with Russia with a proposed peace treaty. 
 November 30 – King Charles XII of Sweden is killed at Fredrikshald in Norway.
 December 1 – The brother-in-law of Charles XII and spouse of Princess Ulrika Eleonora, Frederick of Holstein-Gottorp, discontinue the siege of Fredrikshald. 
 December 2 – Georg Heinrich von Görtz is arrested by Frederick of Hesse for supporting Charles Frederick, Duke of Holstein-Gottorp, the rival of Ulrika Eleonora to the throne. 
 December 5 – The news of the death of Charles XII reaches Stockholm. 
 December 6 – Following the death of Charles XII on November 30, his sister Ulrika Eleonora proclaims herself Queen regnant of Sweden, as the news of her brother's death reaches Stockholm.

Births

 15 July – Alexander Roslin, painter (died 1793) 
 28 November – Hedvig Charlotta Nordenflycht, writer and poet  (died 1763) 
 October 25 – Reinhold Angerstein, metallurgist  (died 1760) 
 Anna Maria Hjärne, courtier (died 1798)

Deaths

 April – Lars Gathenhielm, privateer and pirate  (born 1689) 
 November 30 – King Charles XII of Sweden, monarch   (born 1682)

References

 
Years of the 18th century in Sweden
Sweden